William Theodore Woodhouse (14 September 1873 – 24 November 1934) was an Australian rules footballer who played with Carlton and St Kilda in the Victorian Football League (VFL).

A tall man, Woodhouse was also a keen athlete who occasionally missed games to compete in  cross country races. He started his football career at St. Kilda in 1891.  In 1893 he relocated to Broken Hill for a year before returning to Melbourne. He started at Carlton in 1894 and played in its first VFL match in 1897.

He settled in St. Kilda and eventually took over his father pharmacy.

Bill Woodhouse committed suicide by ingesting cyanide while on holiday in Launceston, Tasmania. He usual place of residence was in Park St. St. Kilda, Victoria. His son gave evidence at the Coroners inquest that his father was a chemist.

Notes

External links 

		
Bill Woodhouse's profile at Blueseum

1873 births
1934 suicides
Australian rules footballers from Melbourne
Carlton Football Club (VFA) players
Carlton Football Club players
St Kilda Football Club players
Suicides in Victoria (Australia)
Suicides by cyanide poisoning
People from St Kilda, Victoria